Prof. Pandit Rao Dharennavar is an Indian lecturer by profession, well known for his translation of social and religious literature between Kannada and Punjabi languages. He is currently Assistant Professor at Government College, Chandigarh.

Birth
He was born at Shirashyad Salotagi of Indi taluk in Bijapur district in 1975. He completed his M. Phil in Sociology from Jawaharlal Nehru University, New Delhi. He joined Government College, Sector 26, Chandigadh in 2003. He is working on translation of Guru Granth Sahib to Kannada for which he received 1 Lakh funds from UT administrator Shivraj Patil.

Works
Translation of following works from Kannada to Punjabi:
 Vachana sahitya 
 Dasa sahitya and Tatva-vada by Allama Prabhu
 Basava
 Akka Mahadevi 
 Sarvajna
 Kanaka Dasa 
 Purandara Dasa, 
 Shishunala Sharif
 Bhimashankar Maharaj.

Translation of following Punjabi works to Kannada:
 Japji Sahib
 Sukhmani Sahib
 Zafarnama (letter)

References

20th-century Indian translators
Living people
Year of birth missing (living people)